College Football USA 97 is a video game of the sports genre released in 1997 by EA Sports. Its cover athlete is former University of Nebraska quarterback Tommie Frazier.

Gameplay
The game added a new "create player" feature (up to 28 players) and custom schedules, new animations and all 111 Division I-A teams. Players can also compete in a customized Tournament with support for up to 16 players in a single-elimination or round robin format.

Players can also adjust penalties, set weather type, enter user records, perform substitutions, set audibles, toggle injuries, and change game length, as well as difficulty level. Authentic playbooks (with plays like the Wishbone), a USA Today/CNN Coaches Poll, and the Sears National Championship Trophy were also available.

Release
College Football USA 97 was the fourth installment of the NCAA Football series. While the game was published for the Mega Drive by EA Sports as usual, the Super NES version was instead published by THQ. The game featured University of Nebraska quarterback Tommie Frazier on the cover.

Contest
In the third quarter of 1996 EA Sports conducted a College Football '97 tour, in which they visited top colleges, holding a competition using the Genesis version of the game. The top four teams were flown to New Orleans in January 1997 to attend both the finals and the Sugar Bowl. The winning team in the finals was awarded a trophy, a video game system of their choice, and a collection of EA Sports games.

Reception

Reviews for this installment were still positive, but reviewers generally commented that the additions and improvements from College Football USA '96 are too subtle, and advised gamers who already owned the previous installment to carefully consider how important the new features are to them before purchasing. However, GamePro called the Super NES port "a complete gridiron debacle. Players fly around the field - except for the man with the ball, whose movements slow down and become jerky. The frame rate and animation are poor (the players look armless), and the sound features the most obnoxious whistle in sports gaming history." They rated it a 1.5 out of 5 in graphics and a 0.5 in every other category (sound, control, and funfactor), making it only the second game to receive a 0.5 or lower from GamePro in any category.

References

External links

1997 video games
College football video games
Electronic Arts games
High Score Productions games
Multiplayer and single-player video games
Super Nintendo Entertainment System games
Video games developed in the United States